Hong Kong first competed at the Olympic Games in 1952, then as a British colony (British Hong Kong). Hong Kong has participated at every Summer Olympic Games (14 summer, 4 winter) since then except for the boycotted 1980 Games, and has also participated in the Winter Olympic Games since 2002. Hong Kong won its first medal/gold medal in 1996, and a second gold medal in the 2020 Games. Apart from those, Hong Kong has also won seven other medals, three silver, and four bronze. Its best performance to-date was the 2020 Summer Olympics, winning one gold, two silver and three bronze medals.

History 
The first Olympic athlete from Hong Kong was Yvonne Yeung, who competed in 1936 for the Republic of China (which now competes as Chinese Taipei), instead of the British colony. The National Olympic Committee (NOC) for Hong Kong was founded in 1950 as the Amateur Sports Federation and Olympic Committee of Hong Kong, and is now known as the Sports Federation and Olympic Committee of Hong Kong, China. It was recognised by the IOC in 1951, and subsequently, Hong Kong was represented separately from Great Britain (for any gold medal ceremony, the colonial flag of Hong Kong was raised and the British national anthem was played) at all future Olympic Games.

After the sovereignty of Hong Kong was transferred to the People's Republic of China (PRC) in 1997, the NOC for the special administrative region has been now known as Hong Kong, China. Hong Kong maintains its own NOC and is represented separately at the Olympics due to International Olympic Committee's grandfather clause. For any gold medal ceremony, the Hong Kong SAR flag is raised and the PRC national anthem is played, even in situations where athletes from China won silver or bronze medal, resulting in Hong Kong SAR flag flying above that of China. As permitted under the constitution promulgated by the PRC upon the SAR prior to handover from the United Kingdom (specifically, Article 151, Chapter 7 of The Basic Law), it "may, on its own, ... maintain and develop relations and conclude and implement agreements with foreign states and regions and relevant international organizations in the appropriate fields, including the economic, trade, financial and monetary, shipping, communications, tourism, cultural and sports fields".

In 2008, Hong Kong was the site of the equestrian venues for the Beijing Summer Olympics.

Medals by Games

Medals by Summer Games

Medals by Winter Games

Medals by Sports

List of medallists

National Olympic Committee 

The National Olympic Committee of Hong Kong, SF&OC, has been repeatedly warned by the Independent Commission Against Corruption (ICAC) and Leisure and Cultural Services Department (LCSD) against corruption and to implement better governance. With Timothy Fok as president of the Olympic Committee, there have numerous allegations of misconduct against the SF&OC and Fok; for example, in August 2016, the Hong Kong Economic Journal released an article, accusing the SF&OC and Timothy Fok of various transgressions. In April 2020, the government's Audit Commission released a 141-page report after investigating the Olympic Committee, describing various failures with the SF&OC, including lax governance. SCMP released an editorial, agreeing with the Audit Commission and stating that the city's sports development was at risk.

Athlete training 

The Hong Kong Sports Institute (HKSI) is a government-funded training center for elite athletes and potential Olympians in Hong Kong. However, its selection of primarily funding 20 tier A sports has caused criticism; billions of HKD have been spent on tier A sports, including sports which are not Olympic sports, and sports which "may not even be able to achieve any breakthrough in the coming years". Additionally, there is a lack of funding for sports outside of those 20 tier A sports, including sports which Asians have done well at. Chung Pak-kwong, professor at Baptist University and former chief executive of HKSI, said that with the money spent, Hong Kong at the 2016 Summer Olympics should have won medals; instead, 0 medals were won.

Naming
Prior to 1997, the team's name was "Hong Kong"; after 1997, the team's name became "Hong Kong, China". In most other languages, this name is used for translation (e.g. French Hong Kong, Chine; Russian Гонконг, Китай Gonkong, Kitay; Simplified Chinese 中国香港 Zhōngguó Xiānggǎng). The Japanese team name is ホンコン・チャイナ Honkon Chaina and the Korean team name is 홍콩차이나 Hongkong Chaina, using English transliterations of the word "China" instead of the native translation.

See also
 List of flag bearers for Hong Kong at the Olympics
 :Category:Olympic competitors for Hong Kong
 Hong Kong at the Paralympics
 Hong Kong at the Asian Games
 Hong Kong at the Commonwealth Games
 Tropical nations at the Winter Olympics

References

External links